Tender is the Flesh is a dystopian novel by Argentine author Agustina Bazterrica. The novel was originally published in Spanish in 2017 and translated by Sarah Moses into English in 2020. Tender is the Flesh portrays a society in which a virus has contaminated all animal meat. Because of the lack of animal flesh, cannibalism becomes legal. Marcos, a human meat supplier, is conflicted by this new society, and tortured by his own personal losses.

Plot summary 
The novel opens by describing the process of slaughtering humans, who are then referred to as "head". The world has fallen into chaos after the "Transition", the term describing an event where a virus that infected animals was found to be deadly to humans, resulting in the mass slaughter and burning of animals, with the world's population forced either to go vegan, or eat each other. Soon cannibalism was institutionalized, industrialized and normalized, with humans bred for consumption known as "special meat". Scavengers, who cannot afford the special meat, consume any dead body available.

Marcos works at one of these slaughterhouses in order to support his ailing father, who suffers from dementia. He describes his internal conflict with his job and the state of the world. Marcos' job involves being a middle man, the one who purchases the "head" and then sells the products. The owner of a breeding center explains the entire process of raising the "head". He notes things like First Generation Pure (FGP's), describing "head" born in the breeding center. The breeding center delivers Marcos a female FGP as a gift.

More of Marcos' personal life is revealed as he talks to his wife Cecilia on the phone. The couple tried repeatedly and unsuccessfully to have a family. They had a son, Leo, who died while still a baby. After his son's death he and his wife separated. It is made clear that he is having an affair with a butcher in town. After their encounter, Marcos' sister Marisa and her family are introduced. She contributes nothing to their father's care. Marcos travels back home and in his interactions with the female FGP, he seems to see her as less of a product. He eventually appears to develop feelings for the FGP and begins having sex with her, which is regarded as one of the worst transgressions in society.

In part two of the novel, significant time has passed. Marcos has named the female FGP Jasmine, due to her smell reminding Marcos of wild jasmine flowers. She has apparently been living in the house with him and is eight months pregnant.

Marcos's elderly father dies, and Marcos scatters his ashes in the zoo his father brought him to as a child, now abandoned. Marisa insists on hosting a "farewell party" for their father, which Marcos reluctantly attends, leaving after discovering his sister's "domestic head."

Marcos comes home to find Jasmine in labor with indications that the baby is in trouble. He calls his wife Cecilia, a professional nurse herself, to come and help. Jasmine gives birth to a boy with Cecilia's help. Marcos tells Cecilia that the baby is theirs now. Marcos knocks Jasmine out and begins bringing her to the barn to slaughter her. Cecilia protests, stating that Jasmine could have given them more children. Marcos closes by saying "She had the human look of a domesticated animal.”

Main characters 

 Marcos: Right-hand man to the owner of the most reputable meat processing plant; he is in charge of daily operations and the supply and distribution of human meat (also called "special meat").
 Jasmine: a human bred for consumption and given to Marcos. She is the mother of Marcos' second son.
 Don Armando: Marcos' father. He suffers from dementia and lives in a nursing home.
 Cecilia: Marcos' estranged wife. She and Marcos communicate mostly over the phone.
 Marisa: Marcos' sister. Obsessed with status and climbing social ladders, Marisa uses her dead father's wake to show off her human meat accessories.

Critical reception 
Tender is the Flesh was a winner of Argentina's Premio Clarin de Novela prize and was praised by several critics. The New York Times Book Review'''s Daniel Kraus described the novel as "powerful" in displaying the monstrosities and desires of the hierarchical structure of capitalism. Kraus also identified that replacing pigs with humans completely alters the view within the novel of industrialized farming. Justine Jordan of The Guardian saw the landscape of the novel as similar to Argentine author Samanta Schweblin's novel Fever Dream. Jordan described Tender Is the Flesh as "vampiric", "provocative" and "sorrowful". Headstuff''s David Tierney highlighted the use of dark humor as complimenting the novel's darkness and horror. Tierney also identified the main weakness of the novel as Bazterrica babying the reader, with the book improving considerably when this restraint is relaxed. 

Scholars such as Megan Todd analyze various ways in which the novel serves as an allegory. Todd in particular described Bazterrica's novel as a metaphor for the politics of exploitation in neoliberal capitalism. Sebastian Williams argues that the novel challenges a traditional humanist conceptualization of Self (as an autonomous, discrete subject), especially regarding the permeable boundaries between the individual and their environment (i.e., what humans consume; the diseases humans contract). Williams also notes that Bazterrica foregrounds broader cultural anxieties about zoonotic diseases; disease is never simply a material fact, but is embedded in cultural narratives that define politics, ethics, and so forth.

References 

2017 Argentine novels
Dystopian novels
Novels about cannibalism
Charles Scribner's Sons books